Derbyshire County Cricket Club in 1968 represents the cricket season when the English club Derbyshire had been playing for ninety-seven years. In the County Championship, they won six matches to  finish eighth in their sixty-fourth season in the Championship. They were eliminated in round 2 of the  Gillette Cup.

1968 season

Derbyshire played 28 games in the County Championship, one match against Cambridge University, and one against the touring Australians. They won six first class matches altogether.  Derek Morgan was in his fourth season  as captain and was top scorer.  Harold Rhodes  took most wickets.

Matches

First Class

Gillette Cup

Statistics

Competition batting averages

Competition bowling averages

Wicket Keeping
Bob Taylor 
County Championship Catches 50, Stumping 7
Gillette Cup  Catches 0, Stumping 0

See also
Derbyshire County Cricket Club seasons
1968 English cricket season

References

1968 in English cricket
Derbyshire County Cricket Club seasons